Petra Mutzel is a German computer scientist, a University Professor of computer science at the University of Bonn. Her research is in the areas of algorithm engineering, graph drawing and combinatorial optimization.

Education and career
Mutzel earned a diploma in 1990 from the University of Augsburg, in mathematics with computer science. She then earned a doctorate in computer science from the University of Cologne in 1994 under the supervision of Michael Jünger, and her habilitation in 1999 from the Max Planck Institute for Informatics. She held a professorship at the Vienna University of Technology beginning in 1999, moving to the Technical University of Dortmund in 2004 and then to the University of Bonn in 2019.

Contributions
In graph drawing, Mutzel has contributed in work on planarization, crossing minimization in layered graph drawing, and SPQR trees, and co-edited a book on graph drawing. She was both the program chair and organizational chair of the 9th International Symposium on Graph Drawing, in Vienna in 2001.

Mutzel's other contributions include works on the Ising model, steganography, and Steiner trees. In 2012, she was program committee co-chair of the Meeting on Algorithm Engineering and Experiments (ALENEX).

Selected publications
.
.
.
.
.
.
.

References

Year of birth missing (living people)
Living people
German computer scientists
German women computer scientists
University of Augsburg alumni
University of Cologne alumni
Academic staff of TU Wien
Academic staff of the Technical University of Dortmund
Graph drawing people